Union Meetinghouse or Union Meeting House, or variations, may refer to:
(sorted by state, then city/town)

Old Union Meetinghouse, Farmington, Maine, listed on the National Register of Historic Places (NRHP) in Franklin County
Mercer Union Meetinghouse, Mercer, Maine, listed on the NRHP in Somerset County
Readfield Union Meeting House, Readfield, Maine, listed on the NRHP in Kennebec County
Union Meeting House, (Former), Westport, Maine, listed on the NRHP in Lincoln County
Union Meetinghouse (Gilford, New Hampshire), listed on the New Hampshire State Register of Historic Places
Union Meetinghouse-Universalist Church, Kensington, New Hampshire, listed on the NRHP in Rockingham County
Union Meeting House (Cape Vincent, New York), listed on the NRHP in Jefferson County
Union Meeting House (Burke, Vermont), listed on the NRHP in Caledonia County
Union Meetinghouse (East Montpelier, Vermont), listed on the NRHP in Washington County
Union Meetinghouse (Ferrisburg, Vermont), listed on the NRHP in Addison County